The 2022 Spengler Cup was held from 26 to 31 December 2022 at the Eisstadion Davos, Davos.

Teams participating
  Team Canada
  HC Sparta Praha
  HIFK Hockey
  Örebro HK
  HC Ambrì-Piotta
  HC Davos (host)

Group stage

Group Torriani

Group Cattini

Knockout stage

Bracket

Quarterfinals

Semifinals

Final

All-Star Team

Source:

References

Spengler Cup
Spengler Cup
Spengler Cup